Diocese of Panama may refer to:
Roman Catholic Archdiocese of Panamá
Anglican Diocese of Panama